This is a list of chapters of the manga Wild Adapter, written by Kazuya Minekura and published by Tokuma Shoten in the Chara bimonthly magazine. The first chapter appeared in April, 2000 and it is an ongoing series. There are currently six volumes released. The bimonthly release of new chapters as well as the author's various health-related hiatus  have led to the relatively slow release rate of the manga. Other companies have been slow to pick up Wild Adapter, such as Taiwan's Sharp Point Press in February 2006, Singapore's Chuang Yi in April 2004, and America's Tokyopop in January 2007, leading to accelerated release of subsequent volumes to catch up with Japan.



Volume list

References

Wild Adapter